Kalle Kristian Coster (born 9 December 1982 in Leiden) is a sailor from the Netherlands. Coster represented his country for the first time at the 2004 Summer Olympics in Athens. With his brother Sven Coster as helmsman, Coster took 6th place as crew in the Dutch Men's 470. Coster's second Olympic appearance was during the 2008 Olympics in Qingdao again as crew in the Men's 470 with his brother as helmsman.  Coster took the 4th place. Again with Sven as helmsman in the Men's 470 Coster crewed the Dutch 470 at the 2012 Olympics in Weymouth. The brothers finished in 12th place.

Kalle Coster is the son of Dick Coster.

Professional life
 CEO at "Sailmon" (2014- Present) '
 Owner of Coster Yachting (2006 – 2014)

Further reading

2004 Olympics (Athens)

2008 Olympics (Qingdao)

2012 Olympics (Weymouth)

References

External links
 
 
 

Living people
1982 births
Sportspeople from Leiden
Dutch male sailors (sport)
Sailors at the 2004 Summer Olympics – 470
Sailors at the 2008 Summer Olympics – 470
Sailors at the 2012 Summer Olympics – 470
Olympic sailors of the Netherlands